Wobic is an unincorporated community in Marquette County in the U.S. state of Michigan.  The community is located within Humboldt Township.  As an unincorporated community, Wobic has no legally defined boundaries or population statistics of its own.

History
Wobic is a name derived from the Menominee language, meaning "rock".

References

Unincorporated communities in Marquette County, Michigan
Unincorporated communities in Michigan